Ian Marsh may refer to:

 Ian Marsh (writer) (born 1960), British writer and editor
 Ian Marsh (footballer) (1955–2021), former Australian rules footballer
 Ian Craig Marsh (born 1956), English musician

See also
 Iain Marsh (born 1980), English-born rugby league footballer